Hemiglypta is a genus of air-breathing land snails or semislugs, terrestrial pulmonate gastropod mollusks in the family Chronidae.

Species
 Hemiglypta blainvilliana (I. Lea, 1840)
 Hemiglypta castaneofusca Thiele, 1928
 Hemiglypta connectens Möllendorff, 1893
 Hemiglypta cuvieriana (I. Lea, 1840)
 Hemiglypta franciscanorum Quadras & Möllendorff, 1896
 Hemiglypta franzhuberi Thach, 2018
 Hemiglypta fraterna Thiele, 1928
 Hemiglypta fulvida (L. Pfeiffer, 1842)
 Hemiglypta globosa (C. Semper, 1870)
 Hemiglypta iloilana M. Smith, 1932
 Hemiglypta infrastriata Möllendorff, 1893
 Hemiglypta mayonensis (Hidalgo, 1887)
 Hemiglypta microglypta Möllendorff, 1893
 Hemiglypta moussoni (C. Semper, 1870)
 Hemiglypta panayensis (L. Pfeiffer, 1842)
 Hemiglypta semperi Möllendorff, 1893
 Hemiglypta sororia Thiele, 1928
 Hemiglypta webbi Bartsch, 1919
Species brought into synonymy
 Hemiglypta blainvilleana (I. Lea, 1840): synonym of Hemiglypta blainvilliana (I. Lea, 1840) (unjustified emendation of the original name)
 Hemiglypta semiglobosa (L. Pfeiffer, 1845): synonym of Hemiglypta fulvida semiglobosa (L. Pfeiffer, 1845) (reversed priority)

References

Seashells-Landsnails-Freshwater Shells. 3 New Genera, 132 New Species & Subspecies, p. 173 pp

External links

 Möllendorff, O. F. von. (1898). Verzeichnis der auf den Philippinen lebenden Landmollusken. Abhandlungen der Naturforschenden Gesellschaft zu Görlitz. 22: 26-208
 Mollendorff, O. F. von. (1893). Materialien zur Fauna der Philippinen. X. Die Gattung Hemiglypta v. Mlldff. Nachrichtsblatt der deutschen Malakozoologischen Gesellschaft. 25(1/2): 1-29

Chronidae